The Hunting of the Snark is a musical based on Lewis Carroll's 1876 poem The Hunting of the Snark, written by composer Mike Batt.

History
The musical began life in 1984 as a costumed concert with the London Symphony Orchestra at the Barbican, conducted by Mike Batt and starring Paul Jones as the Baker and Christopher Cazenove as the narrator.

It was created as a concept album in 1986 but withheld from sale after a dispute with the  record label, CBS (Sony). The recording featured Roger Daltrey, Art Garfunkel, John Gielgud, Stéphane Grappelli, George Harrison, John Hurt, Julian Lennon, Cliff Richard, Captain Sensible, Deniece Williams, and the London Symphony Orchestra. Later that year it was performed as a concert at the Barbican.  "Midnight Smoke" was released as a single on 17 November 1986.

A further (costumed) production took place at the Royal Albert Hall on April Fool's Day 1987, with Justin Hayward taking Art Garfunkel's role of the Butcher from the original recording, Billy Connolly replacing Cliff Richard as the Bellman and Midge Ure performing George Harrison's guitar parts. Other performers recreated their roles from the concept recording. This concert was filmed and screened as a television special in some countries.

In October 1990 The Hunting Of The Snark was successfully presented, again by Batt and by Jackson-Mayo Productions, as a dramatised concert in Australia, at Sydney's State Theatre and The Hills Centre with the Elizabethan Sinfonietta, with Philip Quast starring as The Bellman, Cameron Daddo as The Butcher, Jackie Love as The Beaver, Doug Parkinson as The Barrister, Daryl Somers as The Billiard Marker, John Waters as Lewis Carroll and David Whitney as The Baker. This production also included additional songs that did not appear on the original 1986 recording.

On 24 October 1991 a £2 million budget production of the show opened in London at the Prince Edward Theatre, with striking scenery and designs. 12,000 animated slides were projected from 152 computer-linked projectors arranged around the theatre. Although reviews praised Batt's visual concepts and Quast as the Bellman, the show closed seven weeks later.

The show was later presented as an amateur production  in July 1995 at The Crucible Theatre, Sheffield, with slightly different songs and libretto created by Batt for the occasion. The Sheffield amateur production was produced by Ian Gude for Jolly Good Musical Productions, directed by Steve Morrell, with musical direction by Ian Gude.

Album and DVD
In November 2010, Mike Batt's company Dramatico Entertainment released the original record album from 1986, together with a DVD of the Royal Albert Hall concert from 1987. A sheet music folio of the original album was released to coincide with the 2010 DVD/CD release.

Cast: 
Mike Batt, The Boots
Cliff Richard, The Bellman (album only)
Billy Connolly, The Bellman (DVD only)
Roger Daltrey, The Barrister
Justin Hayward, The Butcher
John Hurt, The Narrator
Julian Lennon, The Baker
Captain Sensible, The Billiard Marker
Midge Ure, The Banker
Deniece Williams, The Beaver

Synopsis
The Hunting of the Snark tells the tale of several characters who go on a sea journey, searching for a mythical creature called "The Snark", whatever it may be, for the Snark is different things to each of the characters.
The Baker's uncle once told him, "If your Snark be a Boojum! ... You will softly and suddenly vanish away, And never be met with again!". Through this journey relationships develop, tensions rise and the Baker's worst nightmare comes true.

Act One
Prologue
Opening Titles
Children Of The Sky
Hymn To The Snark
The Storm and Arrival
Who'll Join Me On This Escapade?
The Way We Think
The Departure
The Bellman's Speech
Midnight Smoke
The Trouble With You
Dancing Towards Disaster

Act Two
The Banker's Fate
The Hunting
Nursery Pictures
Waiting For A Wave
The Butchery Waltz
Snooker Song
The Pig Must Die
More Trouble
The Dismal and Desolate Valley
A Delicate Combination
As Long As The Moon Can Shine
Yet More Trouble
The Vanishing
Whatever You Believe

Creative team
Mike Batt - Writer / Designer / Director
Jamie Hayes - Co-Director
Andrew Bridge - Lighting
Jo-Anne Robinson - Choreographer
Kim Baker - Associate Costume Designer
Derek Healey - Projection Programming and Development
John Delnero - Sound Designer
Chris Slingsby - Audio Visual Supervisor
Timothy Skelly - Assistant Electrician

Original London cast
David McCallum, Lewis Carroll
Kenny Everett, Billiard Marker
Philip Quast, Bellman
Mark McGann, Baker
David Firth, Banker
Roni Hart, Beaver
Peter Ledbury, Broker
Allan Love, Barrister
Gary Martin, Bishop
John Partridge, Butcher
Jae Alexander, Bandmaster / Associate Musical Director

References

External links
Mike Batt's Official Website
The Hunting of The Snark at IMDb

West End musicals
1991 musicals
Works based on Alice in Wonderland
British musicals
Musicals based on poems
Cultural depictions of Lewis Carroll